Judith Gordon (born 1963, Baltimore, Maryland) is a concert pianist and educator.

Education
Gordon studied at Oberlin Conservatory and at New England Conservatory where she studied with Patricia Zander.

New York debut
Gordon gave her New York recital debut on May 27, 1990 at the Metropolitan Museum of Art as part of the museum’s Introductions series. Bernard Holland, reviewing for The New York Times, wrote, "… Ms. Gordon does not have the dominating technique associated with major virtuosos, but she has character and she thinks."

In 1996, Gordon was named the Boston Globe Musician of the Year.

The Celebrity Series of Boston has presented Gordon frequently and she has performed regularly with Emmanuel Music. With Rob Kapilow she explored music of Beethoven and Debussy in his What Makes It Great? programs in Boston, Los Angeles, and New York. Gordon has performed as a soloist with the Boston Pops, the Boston Modern Orchestra Project, the Pro Arte Chamber Orchestra, and the MIT Symphony.

Chamber music performance
Gordon has performed with a variety of musicians, including soprano Lisa Saffer, mezzo-soprano Janice Felty, mezzo-soprano Lorraine Hunt Lieberson, tenor William Hite, and baritone James Maddalena; cellists Andres Diaz, Rhonda Rider, and Yo-Yo Ma; violists James Dunham, Cynthia Phelps, Marcus Thompson, and Roger Tapping; violinists Rose Mary Harbison and Andrew Kohji Taylor; and oboist Douglas Boyd. She has also performed with the following ensembles: Imani Winds; the Jacques Thibaud String Trio; the Arianna String Quartet, Borromeo String Quartet, Lydian String Quartet, and St. Lawrence String Quartet; the Boston Chamber Music Society, Collage New Music, and Santa Fe New Music.

In a 1998 profile, Boston Globe classical music critic Richard Dyer quoted Gordon as saying, "Some of the most beautiful colors and textures on the piano emerge when you're not playing alone."

Collaborations with composers
Gordon has worked with or had music written for her by Martin Brody, Peter Child, Alan Fletcher, John Harbison, David Horne, Lee Hyla, Libby Larsen, and Peter Lieberson.

Teaching
Gordon has taught piano at the Massachusetts Institute of Technology, and served on the jury at the Fischoff National Chamber Music Competition. She performs and teaches at chamber music festivals including the Cape Cod (Massachusetts), Charlottesville (Virginia), Innsbrook (Missouri), Rockport (Massachusetts), Portland (Maine), Santa Fe (New Mexico), Spoleto USA (South Carolina), and Token Creek (Wisconsin) Festivals and Music from Salem (New York), where she is a co-artistic director. Gordon is an Associate Professor of Music at Smith College in Northampton, Massachusetts.

References

External links
 Hear Judith Gordon live in concert from WGBH Radio Boston
 Judith Gordon's faculty page at Smith College
 Music from Salem

1963 births
Living people
Musicians from Baltimore
New England Conservatory alumni
Oberlin Conservatory of Music alumni
Smith College faculty
20th-century American pianists
20th-century American women pianists
21st-century American pianists
21st-century American women pianists
American women academics